Case Ian Punnett (born March 3, 1960) is an American radio broadcaster, author, professor, and Episcopal deacon.

In the early to mid 1980s, Punnett hosted the WLRW morning show in his college town along with Val Wallace. Punnett co-hosted Ian and Margery with his wife on KTMY in Minneapolis-St. Paul and was the regular Saturday night host of the widely syndicated paranormal-themed Coast to Coast AM, created by Art Bell. On December 3, 2011, Punnett announced that due to increasingly acute tinnitus, he would temporarily step down as regular Saturday night host of Coast to Coast AM, being replaced by John B. Wells: effective January 2012, Punnett would host the show one Sunday per month. In July 2013, Punnett ended his radio hosting career in order to begin studies for a doctoral degree.  After receiving his Ph.D. in 2017, he returned as an occasional guest host of Coast to Coast AM in 2018 and became a faculty member and chief operator of the campus radio station at Kansas State University.

Career
Punnett graduated from the University of Illinois at Urbana-Champaign where he was a student columnist for the Daily Illini. After college, under the pseudonym "Ian Case" (his first and middle names transposed), he co-hosted rock morning radio shows on WXLP in the Quad Cities called Ian Case and the Coach and then Ian Case and The Duke with Mike "The Duke" Donegan on then-rock music station WKDF in Nashville, Tennessee in the early-to-mid-1990s. In between his Quad Cities stints, Punnett was also morning man on WMJY in Long Branch, New Jersey.

Punnett went on to talk radio at WGN in Chicago in 1994 then went to Atlanta, Georgia in 1997 to host a nightly talk show on WGST under his real name, Ian Punnett. He returned to the WKDF morning show in 1998, although he remained in Atlanta and broadcast the show from his home studio (while co-host Mike ‘Duke’ Donegan broadcast from the station's Nashville studio). Punnett would occasionally slip up and announce his real name instead of the pseudonym, which inadvertently became a running gag. That show's run ended in early 1999, shortly before WKDF switched to a country music format.

In Minneapolis-St. Paul, Punnett hosted the morning show (6-10 am) on KTMY-FM. It was known as Ian & Margery, and was co-hosted by his wife, Margery (a former TV producer who has worked for CNN as well as for The Oprah Winfrey Show) who did her part of the show from a studio in their home while getting their two teenage boys off to school. Punnett has a Master of Divinity degree from Columbia Theological Seminary in Atlanta, a PhD from the Walter Cronkite School of Journalism and Mass Communication at Arizona State University and has been ordained a Deacon in the Episcopal Church. Since 1998, Punnett has intermittently hosted Coast to Coast AM.

On August 1, 2007, Punnett helped report the Minneapolis bridge collapse on CNN.

Coast to Coast AM
In 1998 Punnett began occasionally hosting Coast to Coast AM. In April 2000, Punnett became the regular Sunday-night host for Coast to Coast.  He was the first person other than Art Bell to be "given" a night of the week in his or her name. In December, 2001, Punnett left Coast to Coast AM with Ian Punnett to do mornings in the Twin Cities for Hubbard Broadcasting and to concentrate on finishing seminary.  His replacement for Sunday nights was George Noory who would eventually take over the entire show when Art Bell retired again a few years later. Although Punnett occasionally acted as a guest host, he did not rejoin Coast to Coast AM on a full-time basis until June 2005 when Art Bell, who had been doing the two weekend shifts again, announced that he wanted to host just one night a week in order to spend more time traveling with his wife, Ramona. Coast to Coast AM with Ian Punnett once again returned to the weekly line-up, this time on Saturdays.

On January 21, 2006, after the death of Ramona Bell, Punnett announced that Art Bell, the creator and original host of Coast to Coast AM would be returning from retirement to host each Saturday and Sunday night. Punnett then moved to Coast to Coast Live with Ian Punnett, a new, four-hour program, on January 28, 2006. The new show occupied a slot (6 pm-10 pm PST/9 pm-1 am EST), the same period that previously broadcast repeats of older Coast to Coast AM episodes (Coast to Coast AM begins at 1 am ET/10 pm PT). Many existing Coast to Coast AM affiliates automatically carried Punnett's new program from its first night, and in subsequent months several new affiliates came on board. As of June 2007, its affiliate count stood around 200. Since his affiliation with C2CAM (especially during his tenure with Coast to Coast Live), Punnett developed a loyal following of his own. He always opened the show with the "reminder" to "hostile invading aliens" hovering just beyond Earth's atmosphere to "eat the Canadians first", saying they are "much tastier" than Americans. After the retirement of Art Bell in July 2007, Coast to Coast Live was discontinued, with Punnett once again becoming host of the Saturday night edition of C2CAM. Show episodes with themes pertaining to cryptozoology or government conspiracies (favorite subjects of Coast to Coast AM) were generally designated to Punnett and slotted for Saturday nights.

On December 3, 2011, Punnett announced that due to increasing problems with his tinnitus, that he would have to step down as regular Saturday night host of Coast to Coast AM, being replaced by John B. Wells. In January 2012, Punnett began hosting the show one Sunday per month.

On May 16, 2013, Punnett announced on the air with George Noory that he would no longer be hosting Coast to Coast one Sunday per month. Punnett hosted his then-last show on July 14, 2013, his 479th episode over 13 years.

On May 6, 2018, George Noory announced that Punnett would return as a host of Coast to Coast, due to improvements in managing his tinnitus symptoms. Beginning in May 2018, Punnett has hosted several shows each month, as one of the show's designated fill-in hosts for nights when Noory was unavailable.

Personal life

Prior to becoming a father, pastor and host for Coast to Coast AM, Punnett held many jobs before beginning his new career as a morning disc-jockey at a local radio station. According to a radio industry executive, Ian started hosting a radio show and the ratings went through the roof. And his general manager loved Punnett. After five years, Punnett decided to enroll in a seminary and eventually host Coast to Coast AM.

In 2010, Punnett also published a children's book, Dizzy the Mutt with the Propeller Butt. His second children's picture book Jackula the Vampire Dog was published in 2011.

His book How to Pray When You're Pissed at God was published in April 2013 by Harmony. The book was inspired by Punnett's discovery during his duties as a chaplain that many religious Americans were uncomfortable expressing anger to clergy or in their prayers. His goal was to illustrate with examples from the Bible how expressing anger is acceptable, even anger towards God.

Punnett entered the Walter Cronkite School of Journalism and Mass Communication at Arizona State University as a Ph.D. student in August 2013. He taught multimedia journalism at Ohio Northern University from 2016- 17. Punnett received his doctorate from Arizona State in 2017, after writing a dissertation titled "Toward a Theory of True Crime: Forms and Functions of Nonfiction Murder Narratives." He is currently a faculty member at Kansas State University and chief operator of the campus radio station KSDB-FM.

Works
A Black Night for the Bluegrass Belle, 2016, Acclaim Press,  (hardcover).
How to Pray When You’re Pissed at God: Or Anyone Else for that Matter, 2013, Harmony Books, Crown Publishers, Inc (Random House),  (hardcover).
Moving Sounds: A Cultural History of the Car Radio, 2019, Peter Lang Inc,  (paperback)
For children:
Jackula the Vampire Dog, 2011, Beaver's Pond Press,  (hardcover).
Dizzy the Mutt with the Propeller Butt, 2010, Beaver's Pond Press,  (hardcover).

References

1960 births
American Episcopal clergy
American talk radio hosts
Coast to Coast AM
Converts to Anglicanism
Lake Forest College alumni
Living people
People from Wilmette, Illinois
Radio personalities from Atlanta
Radio personalities from Chicago 
Radio personalities from Illinois 
Radio personalities from Minneapolis
Radio personalities from Nashville, Tennessee

University of Illinois Urbana-Champaign alumni
Walter Cronkite School of Journalism and Mass Communication alumni